Biswan is a town and a municipal board in Sitapur district in the state of Uttar Pradesh, India.

Geography 
It has an average elevation of 133 metres (436 feet). The twin Sharda Canals flow across the outskirts of the town.

History 
In approximately the 15th century, Biswan was founded and named for Bishwar, a yogi belonging to Baba Vishwanatha Nath. Shekhbari was responsible for numerous buildings in the community including mosques and dargahs. An annual Urs/Mela is conducted in Biswan at Gulzaar Shah Baba mazar.

Demographics
As per Census of India, 2011, the town has a population of 55,780 of which 29,059 are males while 26,721 are females. Male literacy is around 75.30% while female literacy rate is 66.97%.

Religion 
The town population was predominantly Hindu when the town was founded in 14th century. During Muslim rule in following centuries, this town grew in size mainly by Muslim immigration. In 1881, the total population was 8148, of whom 56.5% were Hindus and 43.2% were Muslims. As of 2011, Muslims make up 53.98% where Hindus are 44.91%.

Famous places
Biswan is an old town with a rich history of its culture. Even back in 1881, when the population was just about 8000 people, it has 21 Muhammadan mosques and 17 Hindu temples. As per an old adage, People believe that Biswan is a Scorpion Free zone.

Biswan gets its name from a very famous temple of Lord Shiva, Vishwanath Mandir. A fair of Guljar Shah is hosted every year during winter which is popular across the state of Uttar Pradesh. Patthar Sivala is a temple devoted to Lord Shiva situated at the center of the town and is entirely built of stones. Another temple of Lord Shiva is Doodhnath Mandir, which is more than 200 years old and is located in the area of Shankar Ganj. An "ancient well" within Doodhnath Mandir is more than 200 yrs old.

Industry 
During the British Raj, the town was celebrated for tobacco, cotton prints, printed pottery and tazias or tabuts. The modern day industrial landscape of this town is dominated by a sugar mill named The Seksaria Biswan Sugar Factory, one of the famous Sugar Mills in the district established in 1939. It is located in the outskirts of the town along major district road (MDR) 23C which connects Biswan with four-lane National Highway 24.

References

Cities and towns in Sitapur district